The Marvelous Marvelettes is the fourth studio album released by the Marvelettes for the Tamla label. It is the first album to not feature original Marvelette, Juanita Cowart (except on four tracks), who left the group in early 1963. The group would remain a quartet for the next two years. Also featured on the album is Rosalind Ashford of Martha and the Vandellas, who filled in for Marvelette Wanda Young in the studio while the latter was on maternity leave, while Florence Ballard of The Supremes replaced her in live performances. The album features three singles: 'Strange I Know' (#49 US, #10 R&B), 'Locking Up My Heart' (#44 US, #25 R&B), and 'My Daddy Knows Best' (#67 US).

Track listing 
Side A
 "Strange I Know" (Brian Holland, Lamont Dozier, Freddie Gorman)
 "I Forgot About You" (William Stevenson)
 "Locking Up My Heart" (Brian Holland, Lamont Dozier, Eddie Holland)
 "Which Way Did He Go" (William Stevenson)
 "Silly Boy" (Norman Whitfield)

Side B
 "It's Going to Take a Lot of Doing" (Norman Whitfield, William Stevenson)
 "Smart Aleck" (Norman Whitfield, William Stevenson)
 "My Daddy Knows Best" (Berry Gordy Jr.)
 "Too Strong to Be Strung Along" (Brian Holland, Lamont Dozier, Freddie Gorman)
 "Why Must You Go" (Norman Whitfield, William Stevenson)

Personnel 
 Gladys Horton – lead vocals (all tracks); backing vocals on "Locking Up My Heart"
 Wanda Young – backing vocals (side A, tracks 1 and 3; side B, tracks 3 and 4); co-lead vocals on "Locking Up My Heart"
 Georgeanna Tillman – backing vocals (all tracks)
 Katherine Anderson – backing vocals (all tracks)
 Wyanetta "Juanita" Cowart - backing vocals (side A, track 1 and 3; side B, track 3 and 4)
 Rosalind Ashford - backing vocals (side A, tracks 2, 4, and 5; side B, tracks 1, 2, and 5)
 The Funk Brothers – instrumentation
 Brian Holland – producer
 William "Mickey" Stevenson – producer
 Lamont Dozier – producer
 Norman Whitfield – producer
 Berry Gordy – producer

References

The Marvelettes albums
Tamla Records albums
1963 albums
Albums produced by Brian Holland
Albums produced by William "Mickey" Stevenson
Albums produced by Lamont Dozier
Albums produced by Berry Gordy
Albums produced by Norman Whitfield
Albums recorded at Hitsville U.S.A.